Cyclotron resonance describes the interaction of external forces with charged particles experiencing a magnetic field, thus already moving on a circular path. It is named after the cyclotron, a cyclic particle accelerator that utilizes an oscillating electric field tuned to this resonance to add kinetic energy to charged particles.

Cyclotron resonance frequency
The cyclotron frequency or gyrofrequency is the frequency of a charged particle moving perpendicular to the direction of a uniform magnetic field B (constant magnitude and direction). Since that motion is always circular, the cyclotron frequency is given by equality of centripetal force and magnetic Lorentz force

with the particle mass m, its charge q, velocity v, and the circular path radius r, also called gyroradius.

The angular speed of the rotation is then:
.

Giving the rotational frequency (being the cyclotron frequency) as:
,

It is notable that the cyclotron frequency is independent of the radius and velocity and therefore independent of the particle's kinetic energy; all particles with the same charge-to-mass ratio rotate around magnetic field lines with the same frequency. This is only true in the non-relativistic limit, and underpins the principle of operation of the cyclotron.

The cyclotron frequency is also useful in non-uniform magnetic fields, in which (assuming slow variation of magnitude of the magnetic field) the movement is approximately helical - in the direction parallel to the magnetic field, the motion is uniform, whereas in the plane perpendicular to the magnetic field the movement is, as previously circular. The sum of these two motions gives a trajectory in the shape of a helix.

Gaussian units
The above is for SI units. In some cases, the cyclotron frequency is given in Gaussian units. In Gaussian units, the Lorentz force differs by a factor of 1/c, the speed of light, which leads to:
.

For materials with little or no magnetism (i.e. ) , so we can use the easily measured magnetic field intensity H  instead of B:

.

Note that converting this expression to SI units introduces a factor of the vacuum permeability.

Effective mass

For some materials, the motion of electrons follows loops that depend on the applied magnetic field, but not exactly the same way. For these materials, we define a cyclotron effective mass,  so that:

.

See also 
 Ion cyclotron resonance
 Electron cyclotron resonance

References

External links
 Calculate Cyclotron frequency with Wolfram Alpha
Condensed matter physics
Electric and magnetic fields in matter
Accelerator physics
Scientific techniques